Mauritia is a genus of fan palms which is native to northern South America and to the Island of Trinidad in the Caribbean. Only two species are currently accepted.

References

 
Trees of South America
Trees of Trinidad and Tobago
Arecaceae genera